Angela Pressey (born June 6, 1986) is a retired American female volleyball player. She was part of the United States women's national volleyball team at the 2010 FIVB Volleyball Women's World Championship in Japan.

References

External links
 

1986 births
Living people
American women's volleyball players
Place of birth missing (living people)
Volleyball players at the 2011 Pan American Games
Pan American Games bronze medalists for the United States
Pan American Games medalists in volleyball
Liberos
Outside hitters
African-American volleyball players
Medalists at the 2011 Pan American Games
21st-century African-American sportspeople
21st-century African-American women
20th-century African-American people
California Golden Bears women's volleyball players
20th-century African-American women